Christian Sørensen (born 6 August 1992) is a Danish professional footballer who plays as a left-back for Copenhagen.

Club career 
Sørensen started his football career in Verninge, but has also played for Sanderum and Næsby BK, before he joined Odense Boldklub.

Christian Sørensen joined Odense Boldklub on 1 June 2011. He made his official debut on 16 July against FC Nordsjælland. He scored his first goal against Lyngby BK in the Danish Superliga on 20 August 2011.

After leaving FC Fredericia, Sørensen joined Viborg FF on 9 July 2019 on a 3-year contract. After a few successful seasons at Viborg, it was confirmed on 31 August 2022, that 30-year old Sørensen had joined the Danish champions, F.C. Copenhagen, on a deal until the end of 2025.

Club

International career 
Sørensen played one game with the Denmark U19 national team. He was later a part of the Denmark U21.

Honours
Viborg
Danish 1st Division: 2020–21

References

External links 
 

1992 births
Living people
Danish men's footballers
Association football fullbacks
Christian Sørensen
Danish Superliga players
Danish 1st Division players
Odense Boldklub players
Næsby Boldklub players
Silkeborg IF players
Christian Sorensen
FC Fredericia players
Viborg FF players
F.C. Copenhagen players
Danish expatriate men's footballers
Danish expatriate sportspeople in Iceland
Expatriate footballers in Iceland